FlyNano OY was a Finnish aircraft manufacturer based in Lahti. The company specialized in the design and manufacture of single-seat seaplanes built from carbon fibre. The company's first product, the FlyNano Proto was first flown on 11 June 2012 and first customer deliveries had been expected in 2013.

The company's chief designer, Aki Suokas, previously designed several successful sailplanes and light aircraft, including the Eiri-Avion PIK-20, Valmet PIK-23 Towmaster and the PIK-27.

By 2022 the company website domain was for sale and it is likely that the company ceased operations in about 2020.

Aircraft

References

External links
Official website archives on Archive.org 

Aircraft manufacturers of Finland
Lahti
Flying boats